Nowendoc River, a perennial river of the Manning River catchment, is located in the Northern Tablelands and Mid North Coast districts of New South Wales, Australia.

Course and features
Nowendoc River rises on the eastern slopes of the Great Dividing Range, north of the Black Sugarloaf, south of Walcha and flows generally southeast, joined by two tributaries including Cooplacurripa River and Rowleys River, before reaching its confluence with the Manning River, west of Wingham. The river descends  over its  course.

See also 

 Rivers of New South Wales
 List of rivers of New South Wales (L–Z)
 List of rivers of Australia

References

External links
 

Rivers of New South Wales
Northern Tablelands
Mid North Coast